Jusztinián György Serédi OSB (23 April 1884 – 29 March 1945) was a Cardinal of the Roman Catholic Church and Archbishop of Esztergom and Prince Primate of Hungary. He helped save many thousands of Polish refugees, including thousands of Polish Jews, by helping Henryk Sławik and his associates, like József Antall Senior.

Jusztinián György Serédi was born in Deáki, Hungary (now Diakovce, Slovakia). He joined the Order of Saint Benedict on 6 August 1901, Pannonhalma. He was professed on July 10, 1905. He was ordained on 14 July 1908. He was a member of the community of the abbey of Pannonhalma and faculty member of the International College S. Anselmo, Rome. He was procurator general of his order in Rome.

Episcopate
Pope Pius XI appointed him Archbishop of Esztergom on 30 November 1927. He was consecrated on 8 January 1928 in the Sistine chapel by Pope Pius XI.

Cardinalate
He was made Cardinal-Priest of Ss. Andrea e Gregorio al Monte Celio in the consistory of December 19, 1927. He was a senator in the parliament of Hungary by his own right. He participated in the conclave of 1939 that elected Pope Pius XII. He died in Esztergom in 1945 while still in office.

1930s-1940s
He served in Hungary's Upper Chamber of Parliament and voted in favour of antisemitic legislation first passed in 1938. In 1938 Serédi hosted an Ecumenical Congress along with the future Pius XII.  
In 1939, after the September Invasion of Poland by Germany, at least 150,000 Polish refugees, both civilians and military, found sanctuary in Hungary, and the refugees included thousands of Polish Jews. Responding to the crisis, cardinal Serédi helped organize service for the refugees, ordering Hungarian Church officials to get actively involved in the religious and charitable services in the Polish refugee camps, among others he was instrumental in organizing a school and foster home for the Jewish children, eventually saved through the efforts of Henryk Sławik and his Polish and Hungarian associates. He is said to have quoted John 4:18 "timor non est in caritate sed perfecta caritas foras mittit timorem quoniam timor poenam habet qui autem timet non est perfectus in caritate," when referring to his Polish and Jewish wards.
In the spring of 1944 he issued a statement condemning the attacks on, discrimination against and deportation of the Jews on racial grounds.  Serédi also worked to try to get Catholic Jews exempted from deportation and death, but was only able to get the rule to apply to those who were priests, monks or nuns.  In April 1944 Serédi protested the treatment of Jews by the Nazis in Hungary. On the other hand, he did not make any public condemnation available to Catholics inside Hungary against the deportation of the Hungarian Jews to Auschwitz. On June 29, 1944, he decided against issuing a pastoral letter clarifying the view of the church on this issue.

Serédi's leading the Hungarian church in opposition to the attack on the Jews led to the arrest of two bishops and several priests and nuns. One of the bishops arrested by the Nazis was József Mindszenty.

Sources

1884 births
1945 deaths
20th-century Hungarian cardinals
Archbishops of Esztergom
Burials at Esztergom Basilica
Hungarian Benedictines
Benedictine cardinals